Drâa-Tafilalet is one of the twelve regions of Morocco. It covers an area of 88,836 km2 and had a population of 1,635,008 as of the 2014 Moroccan census. The capital of the region is Errachidia.

Geography
Drâa-Tafilalet is situated in the Atlas Mountains of Morocco. Its main watersheds are that of the Draa River in the west and the Ziz River, which irrigates the Tafilalt oasis, in the east. Drâa-Tafilalet borders five other Moroccan regions: Souss-Massa to the southwest, Marrakech-Safi to the west, Béni Mellal-Khénifra to the northwest, Fès-Meknès to the north, and Oriental to the northeast. It also borders two of Algeria's provinces, Tindouf in the south and Béchar in the southeast.

History
Drâa-Tafilalet was formed in September 2015 by integrating the provinces of Errachidia and Midelt in Meknès-Tafilalet region with three provinces of the Souss-Massa-Drâa region.

Government
Lahbib Choubani of the Justice and Development Party was elected as the regional council's first president on 14 September 2015. Mohamed Fanid was appointed governor (wali) of the region on 13 October 2015. He was succeeded by Mohamed Benribag in 2017.

Subdivisions

Drâa-Tafilalet comprises five provinces:
Errachidia Province
Ouarzazate Province
Midelt Province
Tinghir Province
Zagora Province

Economy
Agriculture and pastoralism have traditionally been major economic activities in the region, but they have been adversely impacted in recent years by increasing desertification. There is a filmmaking industry concentrated in the Ouarzazate area. The fortified towns in the area, such as the World Heritage Site Aït Benhaddou, are popular tourist attractions. Traditional arts and crafts such as the pottery of Tamegroute and the rugs of Taznakht are also significant to the local economy.

Infrastructure
The largest towns in the region, Errachidia and Ouarzazate, are linked together by National Route 10. The Draa valley is served by National Route 9 which also links Ouarzazate with Marrakesh to the northwest. National Route 13 runs along the Ziz valley and links Errachidia with Meknes to the north. Ouarzazate has the busiest airport in the region; the airports at Errachidia and Zagora also have commercial service.

References